Broughderg is a townland of 4,239 acres in County Tyrone, Northern Ireland, 16 km north-west of Cookstown. It is situated in the civil parish of Lissan and the historic barony of Dungannon Upper.

See also 
List of townlands in County Tyrone

References

Townlands of County Tyrone
Civil parish of Lissan